The Libya men's national beach handball team is the national team of Libya. It takes part in international beach handball competitions.

World Championships results
2008 – 12th place
2010 – 11th place

References

External links
IHF profile

National beach handball teams
Beach handball